Paul M. Markowski is an American meteorologist and leading expert on tornadogenesis and the forecasting of supercells and tornadoes.

Career 
He was a principal investigator (PI) for the IHOP, (2002), PAMREX (2003–04), and VORTEX2 (2009–10) field projects and, with Joshua Wurman, Howard Bluestein, et al., was on the VORTEX2 Steering Committee. He has been interviewed widely by newspapers, magazines, television and radio. He authored with Yvette Richardson, Mesoscale Meteorology in Midlatitudes, which is a widely popular textbook worldwide.

Markowski attended Pennsylvania State University (PSU), graduating magna cum laude from Penn State's Schreyer Honors College with a B.S. in meteorology in 1996. He moved on to the University of Oklahoma (OU), earning a M.S. in 1997 and a Ph.D. in 2000, both in meteorology. He has been a professor of meteorology at Penn State since 2001.

In December 2013 Markowski lead authored with Harold Brooks, et al., a prominent op-ed rebuttal to physicist Richard Muller critiquing substantial methodological flaws in his findings that strong to violent tornado activity decreased in recent decades and his tying the stated decline to global warming.

See also 
 Erik N. Rasmussen
 Roger Wakimoto
 Ted Fujita

References

External links 
 Penn State faculty site
 
 

American meteorologists
Storm chasers
Pennsylvania State University alumni
University of Oklahoma alumni
Pennsylvania State University faculty
Living people
Year of birth missing (living people)